The Tecnam P2006T is an Italian high-winged twin-engined all-metal light aircraft, built by Costruzioni Aeronautiche Tecnam based in Capua, Italy, near Naples. The P2006T received airworthiness certification in the European Union by EASA under CS23 in 2003, type certification in 2009, and Federal Aviation Administration FAR Part 23 certification in 2010.

The P2006T is the lightest twin-engined certified aircraft available. It is a four-seat aircraft with fully retractable landing gear and powered by liquid-cooled Rotax engines that can run on 92 octane unleaded automotive gasoline as well as Avgas 100LL.

Design
The P2006T is a twin-engined four-seat cantilever high-wing monoplane with a retractable tricycle landing gear. Its stabilator is attached to the fuselage, mostly aft of the vertical fin (the stabilator is a single unit with a cutout in its leading edge where it mounts to the tailcone). The nosewheel of the tricycle landing gear retracts into the nose cone; the trailing-link main units retract into stubs which extend from the lower fuselage. The fuselage section is a slightly rounded rectangle, higher than it is wide. A door on each side of the fuselage provides access to the seating area; in addition an escape hatch is provided above the two forward seats, to be used if fuselage deformation in a crash prevents those doors from being operable.

The Rotax engine cylinder heads are liquid-cooled; there are cooling vanes on the cylinder barrels. Thus both cooling airflow through the nacelle, and a cooling radiator, are required in each cowl. The electric starters, used to start the engines on the ground, must also be used for an inflight restart, since the highly geared engines cannot be turned by airflow past the stopped propeller. Thus, for FAA certification, the company was required to add a backup battery in addition to the standard battery. The pilot's power quadrant contains three controls for each engine: throttle, propeller rpm, and carburetor heat. The engines have automatic mixture adjustment, so there is no mixture control required on the panel.

The linkage between the flight controls and the flight surfaces is provided by pushrod, rather than the more common use of cables and pulleys.

Operational history
NASA's all electric X-57 Maxwell prototype aircraft is being developed using a P2006T as its basic structure.

Variants

P2006T
Standard civilian version.
P2006T MRI
Maritime patrol variant. 
P2006T MMA
Multi-Mission variant modified with mission equipment by Airborne Technologies. 
T2006A

Operators

 Dominican Air Force

 Guardia Civil

 Air Taxi 

 Romanian Aviation Academy

Italian Air Force - 3 aircraft on lease

Specifications

See also

References

External links

 

Tecnam aircraft
2000s Italian civil utility aircraft
2000s Italian military reconnaissance aircraft
Aircraft first flown in 2007
High-wing aircraft
Twin piston-engined tractor aircraft